Bid Zard (also Romanized as Bīd Zard) is a village in Kheyrabad Rural District, in the Central District of Kharameh County, Fars Province, Iran. At the 2006 census, its population was 76, in 21 families.

References 

Populated places in Kharameh County